Sir Cuthbert Morley Headlam, 1st Baronet,  (27 April 1876 – 27 February 1964) was a British Conservative politician.

Career
Born in Barton upon Irwell, Lancashire, the third of the five sons of Francis John Headlam (1829–1908), stipendiary magistrate of Manchester, and his wife, Matilda (née Pincoffs). The Headlams were a minor gentry family with roots in north Yorkshire.
Headlam was educated at King's School, Canterbury, and then read modern history at Magdalen College, Oxford, where he received his BA in March 1900. 

He was a Clerk in the House of Lords 1897–1924 and became a barrister, Inner Temple in 1906. He served with the Bedfordshire Yeomanry from 1910–1926, was mentioned in despatches in the First World War and awarded the Distinguished Service Order and appointed an Officer of the Order of the British Empire, retiring as lieutenant colonel.

Headlam was elected as Member of Parliament (MP) for Barnard Castle at the 1924 general election. After the loss of his seat in 1929, he stood in the Gateshead by-election in June 1931, coming a close second in what had been a safe seat for Labour. He regained the Barnard Castle seat at the general election in October 1931, but was defeated again at the 1935 general election. He was returned to the House of Commons for a third time at a by-election in June 1940 as MP for Newcastle upon Tyne North, after standing as an "Independent Conservative" and beating the official Conservative Party candidate. He held the seat until he retired from Parliament at the 1951 general election.

Headlam served in government as Parliamentary and Financial Secretary to the Admiralty from 1926–1929; as Parliamentary Secretary to the Ministry of Pensions from 1931–1932; and as Parliamentary Secretary to the Ministry of Transport from 1932–1934.

Headlam was a Durham County Councilor from 1931–1939, and Justice of the Peace for the County of Durham. He was Chairman of the National Union of Conservative and Unionist Associations in 1941. He was created a baronet in the 1935 Birthday Honours and appointed a Privy Counsellor in 1945. He died in 1964 at his home in Bath, Somerset, aged 87.

References

Sources
 Parliament and politics in the age of Churchill and Attlee: the Headlam diaries, 1935–1951 (1999), edited by Stuart Ball

External links 

 

1876 births
1964 deaths
People educated at The King's School, Canterbury
Alumni of Magdalen College, Oxford
British Yeomanry officers
British Army personnel of World War I
Conservative Party (UK) MPs for English constituencies
Councillors in County Durham
Baronets in the Baronetage of the United Kingdom
Members of the Privy Council of the United Kingdom
Companions of the Distinguished Service Order
Officers of the Order of the British Empire
UK MPs 1924–1929
Military personnel from Lancashire
UK MPs 1931–1935
UK MPs 1935–1945
UK MPs 1945–1950
UK MPs 1950–1951
Clerks
English barristers
English justices of the peace
Members of the Inner Temple
Deputy Lieutenants of Durham
Bedfordshire Yeomanry officers